Rajanagaram Mandal is one of the 19 mandals in East Godavari District of Andhra Pradesh. As per census 2011, there are 17 villages. Most of the part of Rajanagaram Mandal is under the jurisdiction of "Greater Rajamahendravaram Municipal Corporation (GRMC)".

Demographics 
Rajanagaram Mandal has total population of 106,085 as per the Census 2011 out of which 53,345 are males while 52,740 are females and the Average Sex Ratio of Rajanagaram Mandal is 989. The total literacy rate of Rajanagaram Mandal is 64.39%. The male literacy rate is 58% and the female literacy rate is 56.51%.

Towns & Villages

Villages 

Bhupalapatnam
G. Yerrampalem
Jagannadhapuram Agraharam
Kalavacherla
Kanavaram
Konda Gunturu
Mukkinada
Namava
Narendrapuram
Palacharla
Patha Thungapadu
Rajanagaram
Srikrishnapatnam
Thokada
Velugubanda
Venkatapuram

See also 
List of mandals in Andhra Pradesh

References 

Mandals in East Godavari district